Kenny Evans may refer to:

Kenny Evans (high jumper), American high jumper
Kenny Evans (American football), American football coach

Human name disambiguation pages